The 2007–08 Wigan Athletic F.C. season was the club's 30th season in the Football League and their third season in the Premier League.

Season summary
Under new manager Chris Hutchings, the team started the season well, winning two of their opening three games and briefly leading the Premiership table for the first time in the club's history. However, after going the next ten games without a win, Wigan found themselves in the bottom three. Hutchings was sacked and Birmingham City's Steve Bruce was appointed as the new manager a couple of weeks later. Results began to improve, and the club steadily pulled away from relegation before finally securing their survival in their penultimate game in a 2–0 away win against Aston Villa. The club finished in 14th place at the end of the season.

Wigan had little success in the cups, and were knocked out of the League Cup in their first game against Hull City. The club also made it to the fourth round of the FA Cup before losing 2–1 to Chelsea. Marcus Bent, on loan from Charlton Athletic, finished the season as the club's top goalscorer with a total of seven goals, and Paul Scharner was voted as the club's Player of the Year.

Final league table

Squad

First-team squad
(Sources)

On loan

Starting 11
Considering starts in all competitions
 GK: #13,  Chris Kirkland, 38
 RB: #25,  Mario Melchiot, 33
 CB: #5,  Fitz Hall, 24
 CB: #19,  Titus Bramble, 27
 LB: #17,  Emmerson Boyce, 26
 RM: #16,  Antonio Valencia, 31
 CM: #11,  Michael Brown, 29
 CM: #18,  Paul Scharner, 39
 LM: #8,  Kevin Kilbane, 36
 CF: #9,  Emile Heskey, 29
 CF: #23,  Marcus Bent, 26

Results

Premier League

Results summary

Results per matchday

FA Cup

League Cup

See also
List of Wigan Athletic F.C. seasons
2007–08 in English football

References

External links
Wigan Athletic 2007/08 fixtures

Wigan Athletic F.C. seasons
Wigan Athletic F.C.